Cingolani is an Italian surname. Notable people with the surname include:

 Andrea Cingolani (born 1990), Italian male artistic gymnast
 Angela Maria Guidi Cingolani (1896–1991), Italian politician
 Daniel Cingolani (born 1961), Argentine racing driver
 Giovanni Cingolani (1859–1932), Italian painter and art-restorer
 Marco Cingolani (born 1961), Italian painter 
 Mario Cingolani (1883–1971), Italian Christian Democrat politician
 Roberto Cingolani (born 1961), Italian scientist

Italian-language surnames